= Aach ed Djâjé =

Mountain in Lebanon

- Location within Lebanon

Highest point
- Elevation: 1,304 m (4,278 ft)
- Coordinates: 33°33′31″N 35°47′45″E

Geography
- Location: Lebanon

Aach ed Djâjé is a mountain of southwestern Lebanon. It has an elevation of 1,304 metres (4,278 ft). It is a Class T- Hypsographic mountain.
